Te Puru is a locality on the western side of the Coromandel Peninsula of New Zealand. State Highway 25 runs through it. Tapu lies about 7 km to the north, and Thames is about 12 km to the south. The Te Puru Stream and about 18 tributaries drain a steep hilly 23 km2 area of the Coromandel Range, almost entirely covered by native forest. It runs through the settlement and into the Firth of Thames to the west. Flooding has been a problem.

Te Puru track runs between Te Puru and Tapu-Coroglen road, intersecting with Waiomu Valley and Crosbies Main Range tramping tracks on the way.

Demographics
Te Puru is described by Statistics New Zealand as a rural settlement. Te Puru is part of the larger Thames Coast statistical area.

Te Puru had a population of 537 at the 2018 New Zealand census, an increase of 33 people (6.5%) since the 2013 census, and a decrease of 3 people (−0.6%) since the 2006 census. There were 228 households, comprising 267 males and 270 females, giving a sex ratio of 0.99 males per female, with 66 people (12.3%) aged under 15 years, 45 (8.4%) aged 15 to 29, 222 (41.3%) aged 30 to 64, and 201 (37.4%) aged 65 or older.

Ethnicities were 89.9% European/Pākehā, 20.1% Māori, 1.7% Pacific peoples, 2.8% Asian, and 2.8% other ethnicities. People may identify with more than one ethnicity.

Although some people chose not to answer the census's question about religious affiliation, 56.4% had no religion, 30.7% were Christian, 1.1% had Māori religious beliefs, 0.6% were Hindu, 0.6% were Buddhist and 3.4% had other religions.

Of those at least 15 years old, 60 (12.7%) people had a bachelor's or higher degree, and 141 (29.9%) people had no formal qualifications. 33 people (7.0%) earned over $70,000 compared to 17.2% nationally. The employment status of those at least 15 was that 135 (28.7%) people were employed full-time, 78 (16.6%) were part-time, and 24 (5.1%) were unemployed.

Thames Coast statistical area

Thames Coast had a population of 1,704 at the 2018 New Zealand census, an increase of 171 people (11.2%) since the 2013 census, and a decrease of 6 people (−0.4%) since the 2006 census. There were 717 households, comprising 846 males and 858 females, giving a sex ratio of 0.99 males per female. The median age was 58.1 years (compared with 37.4 years nationally), with 198 people (11.6%) aged under 15 years, 162 (9.5%) aged 15 to 29, 735 (43.1%) aged 30 to 64, and 606 (35.6%) aged 65 or older.

Ethnicities were 89.6% European/Pākehā, 19.0% Māori, 1.8% Pacific peoples, 1.8% Asian, and 2.1% other ethnicities. People may identify with more than one ethnicity.

The percentage of people born overseas was 14.4, compared with 27.1% nationally.

Although some people chose not to answer the census's question about religious affiliation, 53.0% had no religion, 34.0% were Christian, 0.7% had Māori religious beliefs, 0.2% were Hindu, 0.2% were Muslim, 0.7% were Buddhist and 2.3% had other religions.

Of those at least 15 years old, 234 (15.5%) people had a bachelor's or higher degree, and 372 (24.7%) people had no formal qualifications. The median income was $22,900, compared with $31,800 nationally. 141 people (9.4%) earned over $70,000 compared to 17.2% nationally. The employment status of those at least 15 was that 471 (31.3%) people were employed full-time, 258 (17.1%) were part-time, and 60 (4.0%) were unemployed.

Education
Te Puru School is a coeducational full primary (years 1–8) school with a roll of  students as of

History
Te Puru suffered severe flooding in 2002, when a low-pressure system led to extensive flooding on the Coromandel Peninsula and the south-west Waikato region. Te Puru  and Waiomu were included in the ‘high impact’ area of the storm. Private and public property was damaged during the flood.

References

External links
 Te Puru School website

Thames-Coromandel District
Populated places in Waikato
Populated places around the Firth of Thames